Tulane University School of Social Work is a part of Tulane University is the oldest school of social work in the colloquial Deep South.  The School's slogan is "Do Work That Matters."  The school is located on the main academic quad of Tulane's Uptown New Orleans campus.

Mission
The mission of the Tulane University School of Social Work is to educate future social workers to:

 Engage in dynamic clinical-community practice that is relationship centered, evidence informed, and empowerment focused
 Enhance biopsychosocial capacity and resilience of individuals, families, groups, and communities, with particular attention to the impact of social injustice and oppression
 Create and exchange responsive, community-based knowledge and research for relevant, contemporary, and innovative social work practice

History
Tulane University began offering classes in social welfare in 1914. Sponsored by grants from the American Red Cross, a formal one-year program was implemented in 1921.

By 1927, with funding from a Rockefeller grant, the school became a separate program with a two-year curriculum qualifying students for the Master of Arts. In 1935, the University established the degree of Master of Social Work. The School has awarded the Master of Social Work degree to more than 4,700 students from all 50 of the United States and over 30 other countries.

Alumni
Sidney Barthelemy - former Mayor of New Orleans

External links
School of Social Work's website at tulane.edu.

See also
Tulane University

References

Tulane University
Schools of social work in the United States
Educational institutions established in 1914
1914 establishments in Louisiana